Henry IV ( April 1367 – 20 March 1413), also known as Henry Bolingbroke, was King of England from 1399 to 1413. His grandfather King Edward III had claimed the French throne as a grandson of Philip IV of France, and Henry continued this claim. He was the first English ruler since the Norman Conquest, over three hundred years prior, whose mother tongue was English rather than French.

Henry was the son of John of Gaunt, Duke of Lancaster, himself the son of Edward III. John of Gaunt was a power in England during the reign of his own nephew, Richard II. Henry was involved in the revolt of the Lords Appellant against Richard in 1388, resulting in his exile. After Gaunt died in 1399, Richard blocked Henry's inheritance of his father's duchy. That year, Henry rallied a group of supporters, overthrew and imprisoned Richard II, and usurped the throne, actions that later would lead to what is termed the Wars of the Roses and a more stabilized monarchy.

As king, Henry faced a number of rebellions, most seriously those of Owain Glyndŵr, the self-proclaimed ruler of Wales, and the English knight Henry Percy (Hotspur), who was killed in the Battle of Shrewsbury in 1403. The king suffered from poor health in the latter part of his reign, and his eldest son, Henry of Monmouth, assumed the reins of government in 1410. Henry IV died in 1413, and his son succeeded him as King Henry V.

Early life
Henry was born at Bolingbroke Castle, in Lincolnshire, to John of Gaunt and Blanche of Lancaster. His epithet "Bolingbroke" was derived from his birthplace. Gaunt was the third son of King Edward III. Blanche was the daughter of the wealthy royal politician and nobleman Henry, Duke of Lancaster. Gaunt enjoyed a position of considerable influence during much of the reign of his own nephew, King Richard II. Henry's elder sisters were Philippa, Queen of Portugal, and Elizabeth, Duchess of Exeter. His younger half-sister, the daughter of his father's second wife, Constance of Castile, was Katherine, Queen of Castile. He also had four natural half-siblings born of Katherine Swynford, originally his sisters' governess, then his father's longstanding mistress and later third wife. These illegitimate children were given the surname Beaufort from their birthplace at the Château de Beaufort in Auvergne-Rhône-Alpes, France.

Henry's relationship with his stepmother, Katherine Swynford, was a positive one, but his relationship with the Beauforts varied. In his youth, he seems to have been close to all of them, but rivalries with Henry and Thomas Beaufort proved problematic after 1406. Ralph Neville, 4th Baron Neville, married Henry's half-sister Joan Beaufort. Neville remained one of his strongest supporters, and so did his eldest half-brother John Beaufort, even though Henry revoked Richard II's grant to John of a marquessate. Thomas Swynford, a son from Katherine's first marriage, was another loyal companion. Thomas was Constable of Pontefract Castle, where Richard II is said to have died.

Henry's half-sister Joan was the mother of Cecily Neville. Cecily married Richard, 3rd Duke of York, and had several offspring, including Edward IV and Richard III, making Joan the grandmother of two Yorkist kings of England.

Relationship with Richard II

Henry experienced a more inconsistent relationship with King Richard II than his father had. First cousins and childhood playmates, they were admitted together as knights of the Order of the Garter in 1377, but Henry participated in the Lords Appellants' rebellion against the king in 1387. After regaining power, Richard did not punish Henry, although he did execute or exile many of the other rebellious barons. In fact, Richard elevated Henry from Earl of Derby to Duke of Hereford.

Henry spent the full year of 1390 supporting the unsuccessful siege of Vilnius (capital of the Grand Duchy of Lithuania) by Teutonic Knights with 70 to 80 household knights. During this campaign, he bought captured Lithuanian women and children and took them back to Königsberg to be converted, despite Lithuanians being baptised by Polish priests for a decade at this point. 

Henry's second expedition to Lithuania in 1392 illustrates the financial benefits to the Order of these guest crusaders. His small army consisted of over 100 men, including longbow archers and six minstrels, at a total cost to the Lancastrian purse of £4,360. Despite the efforts of Henry and his English crusaders, two years of attacks on Vilnius proved fruitless. In 1392–93 Henry undertook a pilgrimage to Jerusalem, where he made offerings at the Holy Sepulchre and at the Mount of Olives. Later he vowed to lead a crusade to 'free Jerusalem from the infidel', but he died before this could be accomplished.

The relationship between Henry and the king met with a second crisis. In 1398, a remark regarding Richard II's rule by Thomas de Mowbray, 1st Duke of Norfolk, was interpreted as treason by Henry who reported it to the king. The two dukes agreed to undergo a duel of honour (called by Richard II) at Gosford Green near Caludon Castle, Mowbray's home in Coventry. Yet before the duel could take place, Richard decided to banish Henry from the kingdom (with the approval of Henry's father, John of Gaunt) to avoid further bloodshed. Mowbray was exiled for life.

John of Gaunt died in February 1399. Without explanation, Richard cancelled the legal documents that would have allowed Henry to inherit Gaunt's land automatically. Instead, Henry would be required to ask for the lands from Richard.

Accession 
After some hesitation, Henry met the exiled Thomas Arundel, former archbishop of Canterbury, who had lost his position because of his involvement with the Lords Appellant. Henry and Arundel returned to England while Richard was on a military campaign in Ireland. With Arundel as his advisor, Henry began a military campaign, confiscating land from those who opposed him and ordering his soldiers to destroy much of Cheshire. Henry initially announced that his intention was to reclaim his rights as Duke of Lancaster, though he quickly gained enough power and support to have himself declared King Henry IV, imprison King Richard (who died in prison under mysterious circumstances) and bypass Richard's 7-year-old heir-presumptive, Edmund de Mortimer, 5th Earl of March.

Henry's coronation, on 13 October 1399 at Westminster Abbey, may have marked the first time since the Norman Conquest that the monarch made an address in English.

Reign 

Henry procured an Act of Parliament to ordain that the Duchy of Lancaster would remain in the personal possession of the reigning monarch. The Barony of Halton was vested in that dukedom.

Henry consulted with Parliament frequently, but was sometimes at odds with the members, especially over ecclesiastical matters. On Arundel's advice, Henry obtained from Parliament the enactment of De heretico comburendo in 1401, which prescribed the burning of heretics, an act done mainly to suppress the Lollard movement. In 1410, Parliament suggested confiscating church land. Henry refused to attack the Church that had helped him to power, and the House of Commons had to beg for the bill to be struck off the record.
Henry's first major problem as monarch was what to do with the deposed Richard. After an early assassination plot was foiled in January 1400, Richard died in prison aged 33, probably of starvation. Though Henry is often suspected of having his predecessor murdered, there is no substantial evidence to prove that claim. Some chroniclers claimed that the despondent Richard had starved himself, which would not have been out of place with what is known of Richard's character. Though council records indicate that provisions were made for the transportation of the deposed king's body as early as 17 February, there is no reason to believe that he did not die on 14 February, as several chronicles stated. It can be positively said that he did not suffer a violent death, for his skeleton, upon examination, bore no signs of violence; whether he did indeed starve himself or whether that starvation was forced upon him are matters for lively historical speculation.

After his death, Richard's body was put on public display in the old St Paul's Cathedral, both to prove to his supporters that he was truly dead and also to prove that he had not suffered a violent death. This did not stop rumours from circulating for years after that he was still alive and waiting to take back his throne. Henry had Richard discreetly buried in the Dominican Priory at Kings Langley, Hertfordshire, where he remained until King Henry V brought his body back to London and buried him in the tomb that Richard had commissioned for himself in Westminster Abbey.

Rebellions

Henry spent much of his reign defending himself against plots, rebellions, and assassination attempts. Rebellions continued throughout the first 10 years of Henry's reign, including the revolt of Owain Glyndŵr, who declared himself Prince of Wales in 1400, and the rebellions led by Henry Percy, 1st Earl of Northumberland, from 1403. The first Percy rebellion ended in the Battle of Shrewsbury in 1403 with the death of the earl's son Henry, a renowned military figure known as "Hotspur" for his speed in advance and readiness to attack. Also in this battle, Henry IV's eldest son, Henry of Monmouth, later King Henry V, was wounded by an arrow in his face. He was cared for by royal physician John Bradmore. Despite this, the Battle of Shrewsbury was a royalist victory. Monmouth's military ability contributed to the king's victory (though Monmouth seized much effective power from his father in 1410).

In the last year of Henry's reign, the rebellions picked up speed. "The old fable of a living Richard was revived", notes one account, "and emissaries from Scotland traversed the villages of England, in the last year of Henry's reign, declaring that Richard was residing at the Scottish Court, awaiting only a signal from his friends to repair to London and recover his throne."

A suitable-looking impostor was found and King Richard's old groom circulated word in the city that his master was alive in Scotland. "Southwark was incited to insurrection" by Sir Elias Lyvet (Levett) and his associate Thomas Clark, who promised Scottish aid in carrying out the insurrection. Ultimately, the rebellion came to naught. Lyvet was released and Clark thrown into the Tower.

Foreign relations

Early in his reign, Henry hosted the visit of Manuel II Palaiologos, the only Byzantine emperor ever to visit England, from December 1400 to February 1401 at Eltham Palace, with a joust being given in his honour. Henry also sent monetary support with Manuel upon his departure to aid him against the Ottoman Empire.

In 1406, English pirates captured the future James I of Scotland, aged eleven, off the coast of Flamborough Head as he was sailing to France. James was delivered to Henry IV and remained a prisoner for the rest of Henry's reign.

Final illness and death
The later years of Henry's reign were marked by serious health problems. He had a disfiguring skin disease and, more seriously, suffered acute attacks of a grave illness in June 1405; April 1406; June 1408; during the winter of 1408–09; December 1412; and finally a fatal bout in March 1413. In 1410, Henry had provided his royal surgeon Thomas Morstede with an annuity of £40 p.a. which was confirmed by Henry V immediately after his succession. This was so that Morstede would 'not be retained by anyone else'. Medical historians have long debated the nature of this affliction or afflictions. The skin disease might have been leprosy (which did not necessarily mean precisely the same thing in the 15th century as it does to modern medicine), perhaps psoriasis, or a different disease. The acute attacks have been given a wide range of explanations, from epilepsy to a form of cardiovascular disease. Some medieval writers felt that he was struck with leprosy as a punishment for his treatment of Richard le Scrope, Archbishop of York, who was executed in June 1405 on Henry's orders after a failed coup.

According to Holinshed, it was predicted that Henry would die in Jerusalem, and Shakespeare's play repeats this prophecy. Henry took this to mean that he would die on crusade. In reality, he died in the Jerusalem Chamber in the abbot's house of Westminster Abbey, on 20 March 1413 during a convocation of Parliament. His executor, Thomas Langley, was at his side.

Burial

Despite the example set by most of his recent predecessors, Henry and his second wife, Joan of Navarre, Queen of England, were not buried at Westminster Abbey but at Canterbury Cathedral, on the north side of Trinity Chapel and directly adjacent to the shrine of St Thomas Becket. Becket's cult was then still thriving, as evidenced in the monastic accounts and in literary works such as The Canterbury Tales, and Henry seemed particularly devoted to it, or at least keen to be associated with it. Reasons for his interment in Canterbury are debatable, but it is highly likely that Henry deliberately associated himself with the martyr saint for reasons of political expediency, namely, the legitimisation of his dynasty after seizing the throne from Richard II. Significantly, at his coronation, he was anointed with holy oil that had reportedly been given to Becket by the Virgin Mary shortly before his death in 1170; this oil was placed inside a distinct eagle-shaped container of gold. According to one version of the tale, the oil had then passed to Henry's maternal grandfather, Henry of Grosmont, 1st Duke of Lancaster.

Proof of Henry's deliberate connection to Becket lies partially in the structure of the tomb itself. The wooden panel at the western end of his tomb bears a painting of the martyrdom of Becket, and the tester, or wooden canopy, above the tomb is painted with Henry's personal motto, 'Soverayne', alternated by crowned golden eagles. Likewise, the three large coats of arms that dominate the tester painting are surrounded by collars of SS, a golden eagle enclosed in each tiret. The presence of such eagle motifs points directly to Henry's coronation oil and his ideological association with Becket. Sometime after Henry's death, an imposing tomb was built for him and his queen, probably commissioned and paid for by Queen Joan herself. Atop the tomb chest lie detailed alabaster effigies of Henry and Joan, crowned and dressed in their ceremonial robes. Henry's body was evidently well embalmed, as an exhumation in 1832 established, allowing historians to state with reasonable certainty that the effigies do represent accurate portraiture.

Titles and arms

Titles
 Styled Earl of Derby (1377–97)
 Earl of Northampton and Hereford (22 December 1384 – 30 September 1399)
 Duke of Hereford (29 September 1397 – 30 September 1399)
 Duke of Lancaster (3 February – 30 September 1399)
 King of England and Lord of Ireland (30 September 1399 – 20 March 1413)

Arms
Before his father's death in 1399, Henry bore the arms of the kingdom, differenced by a label of five points ermine. After his father's death, the difference changed to a label of five points per pale ermine and France. Upon his accession as king, Henry updated the arms of the kingdom to match an update in those of royal France—from a field of fleur-de-lys to just three.

Genealogy

Marriages and issue

First marriage: Mary de Bohun
The date and venue of Henry's first marriage to Mary de Bohun (died 1394) are uncertain but her marriage licence, purchased by Henry's father John of Gaunt in June 1380, is preserved at the National Archives. The accepted date of the ceremony is 5 February 1381, at Mary's family home of Rochford Hall, Essex. The near-contemporary chronicler Jean Froissart reports a rumour that Mary's sister Eleanor de Bohun kidnapped Mary from Pleshey Castle and held her at Arundel Castle, where she was kept as a novice nun; Eleanor's intention was to control Mary's half of the Bohun inheritance (or to allow her husband, Thomas, Duke of Gloucester, to control it). There Mary was persuaded to marry Henry. They had six children:

Henry had four sons from his first marriage, which was undoubtedly a clinching factor in his acceptability for the throne. By contrast, Richard II had no children and Richard's heir-presumptive Edmund Mortimer was only seven years old. The only two of Henry's six children who produced legitimate children to survive to adulthood were Henry V and Blanche, whose son, Rupert, was the heir to the Electorate of the Palatinate until his death at 20. All three of his other sons produced illegitimate children. Henry IV's male Lancaster line ended in 1471 during the War of the Roses, between the Lancastrians and the Yorkists, with the deaths of his grandson Henry VI and Henry VI's son Edward, Prince of Wales.

Second marriage: Joanna of Navarre
Mary de Bohun died in 1394, and on 7 February 1403 Henry married Joanna, the daughter of Charles II of Navarre, at Winchester. She was the widow of John IV, Duke of Brittany (known in traditional English sources as John V), with whom she had had four daughters and four sons; however, her marriage to the King of England was childless.

Mistresses
By an unknown mistress, Henry IV had one illegitimate child:
 Edmund Leboorde (1401 – shortly before 19 December 1419)

See also
Cultural depictions of Henry IV of England
Naish Priory in Somerset contains corbelled heads of Henry IV and Joanna celebrating their marriage, at the manor of Mary de Bohun's late and powerful great-aunt, Margaret de Bohun
 List of earls in the reign of Henry IV of England
 Mouldwarp

Notes

References

Works cited

External links

Henry IV at the official website of the British monarchy
Henry IV at BBC History

|-

 
1367 births
1413 deaths
14th-century English nobility
14th-century English monarchs
15th-century English monarchs
Deaths from skin disease
Dukes of Lancaster
Earls of Derby
English expatriates
English expatriates in Lithuania
English people of French descent
English pretenders to the French throne
Burials at Canterbury Cathedral
House of Lancaster
Knights of the Garter
Lord High Stewards
People from East Lindsey District
People of the Hundred Years' War
Barons of Halton
Peers created by Richard II